Callander is a surname of Scottish origin. Notable people with the surname include:

 Charlie Callander, property steward of Richmond Football Club in Australian Rules Football
 Don Callander, American novelist
 Donald Callander, British Army officer
 Drew Callander, Canadian hockey player (played for Philadelphia and Vancouver)
 Gary Callander, Scottish Rugby Union player
 Jock Callander, Canadian hockey player and coach (played for Pittsburgh and Tampa Bay) 
 Peter Callander, British songwriter